Monte Verde is an archaeological site in the Llanquihue Province in southern Chile, located near Puerto Montt, Southern Chile, which has been dated to possibly as early as 18,500 cal BP (16,500 BC). Previously, the widely accepted date for early occupation at Monte Verde was about 14,500 years cal BP. This dating added to the evidence showing that the human settlement of the Americas pre-dates the Clovis culture by roughly 1,000 years (or 5,000 years if the 18,500 BP dates are confirmed). This contradicts the previously accepted "Clovis first" model which holds that settlement of the Americas began after 13,500 cal BP. The Monte Verde findings were initially dismissed by most of the scientific community, but the evidence then became more accepted in archaeological circles.

Paleoecological evidence of the coastal landscape's ability to sustain human life further supports a "coastal migration" model. Dating of rock surfaces and animal bones suggests the coastal corridor was deglaciated and became habitable after 17,000 years BP. Although testing coastal migration theories can be difficult due to sea level rise since the last glacial maximum, archaeologists are increasingly willing to accept the possibility that the initial settlement of the Americas occurred via coastlines.

History

Discovery
The site was discovered in late 1975 when a veterinary student visited the area of Monte Verde, where severe erosion was occurring due to logging. Prior to the logging, the site itself had been preserved well due to the favorable conditions created by the Chinchihuapi creek banks. The student was shown a strange "cow bone" collected by nearby peasants who had found it exposed in the eroded Chinchihuapi Creek. The bone later proved to be from a gomphothere. Tom Dillehay, an American anthropologist and professor at the Universidad Austral de Chile at the time, started excavating Monte Verde in 1977.

One of the rare open-air prehistoric sites found so far in the Americas, Monte Verde was well preserved because it was located in an anaerobic bog environment near the creek. A short time after the site was originally occupied, the waters of the creek rose and a peat-filled bog formed that inhibited the bacterial decay of organic material and preserved many perishable artifacts and other items for millennia.

Radiocarbon dating of bones and charcoal in 1982 gave the site an average age of 14,800 BP (calibrated), more than 1,000 years earlier than the oldest-known site of human habitation in the Americas at that time.

In the initial excavation, two large hearths and many small ones were found. The remains of local animals were discovered, in addition to wooden posts from approximately twelve huts. Scraps of clothing made of hide were also found. This led archaeologists to estimate the population was around 20–30 inhabitants. A human footprint was also observed in the clay, probably from a  adult. Inside the camp, archaeologists found a chunk of meat that still had preserved DNA. After a DNA analysis, it matched that of a gomphothere, indicating what type of food the inhabitants ate.

Stratigraphy 
The Monte Verde site has two distinct levels. The upper level, MV-II, has been extensively characterized. Its occupation is reliably dated to sometime between 14,800 – 13,800 BP. 

The lower level, MV-I, is less well understood. It was more ephemeral, having come from ancient river sediments. Dillehay found charcoal scatters which may have been the remains of fireplaces next to stone and wood artifacts. These were dated to at least 33,000BP. He acknowledges MV-I has issues, such as uncertain artifacts, doubtful radiocarbon dates, and unreliable contexts. He hesistates to accept this level without additional evidence, including sites of similar age in the Americas.

Monte Verde Level I (MV-I) 
Monte Verde I is located under an outwash plain, which formed during the last glaciation. It is not directly below MV-II. It was first concluded to be a site of human occupation because of three clay-lined burned areas and 26 stones, 13 of which may have been modified by humans. In 2013, Dillehay and his team returned to perform another excavation at Monte Verde due to the inadequate previous excavations. In 2015, Monte Verde I was re-dated to around 18,500 to 14,500 BP. Charcoal remains, charred animal bone fragments and several lithic artifacts, about 34% of which were derived from non-local sources, were discovered. The older end of this range is controversial, however, as it is based off putative lithic tools which some have suggested are instead naturally occurring objects.

Monte Verde Level II (MV-II) 
According to Dillehay and his team, Monte Verde II was occupied around 14,800 – 13,800 BP by about twenty to thirty people.  A twenty-foot-long tent-like structure of wood and animal hides was erected on the banks of the creek and was framed with logs and planks staked in the ground, making walls of poles covered with animal hides.  Using ropes made of local reeds, the hides were tied to the poles creating separate living quarters within the main structure.  Outside the tent-like structure, two large hearths had been built for community usage, most probably for tool making and craftwork.

Each of the living quarters had a brazier pit lined with clay. Around those hearths, many stone tools and remnants of spilled seeds, nuts, and berries were found. A 13,000-year-old specimen of the wild potato, Solanum maglia, was also found at the site; these remains, the oldest on record for any species of potato, wild or cultivated, suggest that southern Chile was one of the two main centres for the evolution of Solanum tuberosum tuberosum, the common potato. This suggested that the people of Monte Verde either had traded on or traveled regularly in this extended network.

Other important finds from this site include human coprolites, a footprint, assumed to have been made by a child, stone tools, and cordage.  Dr. Dillehay obtained the date for this site by  radiocarbon dating charcoal and bone found within the site.

In the May 9, 2008 issue of Science, a team reported that they identified nine species of seaweed and marine algae recovered from hearths and other areas in the ancient settlement. The seaweed samples were directly dated between 14,220 and 13,980 years ago.

Associated sites 
Another Chinchihuapi Creek site (with two layers labeled CH-I and CH-II), located about 500 meters upstream the same river that the Monte Verde site is on, has been dating to about 14,500 BP. Similar materials such as burned areas and fragmentary scorched animal bones associated with small rock flakes have been recovered. Between the sites, Dillehay and his team excavated test pits and core drillings, finding 12 small burned features directly associated with both burned and unburned animal remains, manuport stones, and anthropologically modified flakes dated between 18,500 BP - 14,500 BP. These findings may represent seasonal activities around the area. As of 2019, Dillehay has led two more excavations at the Chinchihuapi site, finding lithic tools and flakes alongside burned features associated with burned animal and plant remains in CH-I.

Interpretations 
Material evidence gathered at Monte Verde has reshaped the way archaeologists think about the earliest inhabitants of the Americas. Radiocarbon dating has provided a date of 14,000 BP and possibly 14,800-33,000 BP. Previously, the earliest accepted site had been determined to be near Clovis, New Mexico, dating between 13,500 and 13,000 BP, over 1,000 years later than Monte Verde.

The new dates supplied by Monte Verde have made the site a key factor in the debate over the first migration route from Asia to North America. Before the discovery of Monte Verde, the most popular and widely accepted theory was the overland route, which speculates that the first American inhabitants migrated from Asia across the Bering Strait and then spread throughout North America. However, the early dates associated with Monte Verde appear to weaken this theory. Prior to 13,000 BP, the Cordilleran Glacier (which covered much of present-day Canada) had not yet melted enough to reveal an ice-free corridor for people to reasonably journey by foot. The Monte Verde radiocarbon dates precede 13,000 BP, despite the fact that before the glacial melt, the vast, desolate, icy landscape of much of the Americas could not possibly have permitted enough vegetation to sustain traveling people or herded animals.

The most prevalent theory today is the coastal migration hypothesis, which argues that people migrated from Asia down along the western coasts of North and South America. Monte Verde is located 8,000 miles south of the Bering Strait. Such a considerable distance was probably unreasonable to trek by foot, especially on ice. Furthermore, remains of 22 varieties of seaweed are referenced in regards to this theory. Modern native inhabitants of the regions use these particular local seaweed varieties for medicinal purposes. Using an ethnographic analogy, this suggests that the Monte Verde residents used these varieties for similar purposes, which further suggests an extensive knowledge of marine resources. Together with a relative lack of stone tools, it appears that these first settlers were maritime-adapted hunter-gatherer-fishermen, and not necessarily big-game hunters like the Clovis. Therefore, it is feasible that they traveled along the coast by boat or along the shoreline, and could survive on marine resources throughout the voyage south.

The presence of non-local items at Monte Verde, such as plants, beach-rolled pebbles, quartz, and tar, indicates possible trade networks and other sites of human habitation of similar age.

Academic history

Diffusion
Awareness about Monte Verde among the international archaeology community was greatly increased in 1989 when Dillehay delivered a presentation on Monte Verde at a conference on settlement of the Americas at the University of Maine. Archaeologist David J. Meltzer notes on that presentation:
The images Tom Dillehay was showing of the well-preserved remains at Monte Verde—wooden artifacts and house planks, fruits, berries, seeds, leaves, and stems, as well as marine algae, crayfish, chunks of animal hide, and what appeared to be several human coprolites found in three small pits—were unlike anything most of us, who long ago had learned to be used to stone tools and grateful for occasional bits of bone, had ever seen.

Pre-Clovis controversy 
Because of the nature of the preservation of Monte Verde, it was one of the first Pre-Clovis sites to be accepted by the academic community. Dillehay, himself, doubted his dates due to the stronghold the Clovis First hypothesis has on the academic community. Monte Verde was one of the most accepted Pre-Clovis sites, according to a survey done by Amber Wheat in 2012. Out of 132 respondents (mainly archaeologists), approximately 65% of them confirmed Monte Verde as a Pre-Clovis site. Still, the early date for the site was not widely accepted until 1997. It had hitherto been generally agreed that ancient people had entered the Americas using the Bering Strait Land Bridge, which was about 13,000 kilometers (8,000 miles) north of the Monte Verde site. Though the Monte Verde site does not disprove the Bering Strait theory, it does support the theory that, instead of going down the ice free corridor as previously hypothesized, people may have populated the Americas through a coastal route. A group of 12 respected archaeologists revisited the site in 1997 and concluded that Monte Verde was an inhabited site and predated the Clovis culture. One of Dillehay's colleagues, Dr. Mario Pino, claimed a lower layer of the site is 33,200 years old, based on the discovery of burned wood several hundred feet to the south of Monte Verde. Radiocarbon dating established the wood as 33,000 years old. Dillehay was cautious of this earlier date, and as of 2007 it has not been verified or accepted by the scientific community.

Comparison to other early Americas sites
MV-I has been radiocarbon dated to 33,000 BP. As with other sites that suggest extremely early dates, such as the Topper site in South Carolina and Pedra Furada in Brazil, this deeper layer remains controversial.

The only other archaeological site in Southern Chile comparable in age to Monte Verde is Pilauco Bajo, dated to 12,500–11,000 BP. Researchers postulated that the two sites were complementary – Monte Verde would be a habitation site, and Pilauco Bajo would be a hunting and scavenging site. Further south lies the Pali Aike Crater lava tube, dated to 14,000–10,000  BP.

The Chinchorro culture, which was mostly a coastal culture of northern Chile and southern Peru, originated ca. 9,000 years BP, and was long lasting. Other sites on the coast, such as the Quebrada Jaguay, and Quebrada Tacahuay of Peru, seem to go back to ca. 13,000-12,000 BP. Huaca Prieta in northern Peru was occupied as early as 15,000 BP.

See also
 Pre-Columbian trans-oceanic contact
 Archaeology of the Americas
 Prehispanic history of Chile
 Models of migration to the New World
 Meadowcroft Rockshelter
 Ñadi
 Lagoa Santa
 Paisley Caves - (coprolites and stone tools)

References

External links 
 
 Monte Verde at UNESCO World Heritage
 

Archaeological cultures of South America
Pre-Columbian cultures
Archaeological sites in Chile
Geography of Los Lagos Region
Former populated places in Chile
Pre-Clovis archaeological sites in the Americas
National Monuments of Chile
Puerto Montt